Church Cross railway station was on the Schull and Skibbereen Railway in County Cork, Ireland.

History

The station opened on 6 September 1886.

Regular passenger services were withdrawn on 27 January 1947.

Routes

Further reading

References

Disused railway stations in County Cork
Railway stations opened in 1886
Railway stations closed in 1947
1886 establishments in Ireland
1947 disestablishments in Ireland
Railway stations in the Republic of Ireland opened in the 19th century